Scott Van Pelt (born ) is an American sportscaster and sports talk show host. He co-anchored the 11 p.m. edition of SportsCenter on ESPN, served as the co-host of SVP & Russillo alongside Ryen Russillo on ESPN Radio, and hosts various golf events for the network. In June 2015, Van Pelt left his radio show to become a solo anchor for a midnight edition of SportsCenter.

Early life and education
Van Pelt was born in Brookeville, Maryland, and grew up in the Washington, D.C., area. He attended Flower Valley Elementary School in Rockville, Maryland. He graduated from Sherwood High School in Sandy Spring, Maryland, and from the University of Maryland in 1988 where he studied radio/television and film. He is a member of the Pi Kappa Alpha fraternity.

Career
Van Pelt began his career in sportscasting in 1990 at WTTG-TV, a FOX affiliate in Washington, D.C. From 1995 to 2000, Van Pelt worked for the Golf Channel, where he was a studio host for some of the network's signature programs. He left the channel in 2001 to join ESPN, where he serves as a SportsCenter anchor, and is one of the network's top golf correspondents, covering major tournaments such as the Masters Tournament. After acquiring the cable rights to the tournament, Van Pelt also appeared on ESPN's coverage of The Open Championship. He also is a prominent personality for ESPN Radio, where he was the co-host of Tirico and Van Pelt alongside Mike Tirico before the program was canceled and replaced with Van Pelt's own three-hour program, The Scott Van Pelt Show, in 2009. The show was renamed SVP & Russillo in October 2012. He is a studio presenter for the ESPN Network's Friday night College Football on ESPN.

Van Pelt has also appeared as a commentator in golf video games, alongside Kelly Tilghman on EA Sports' Tiger Woods PGA Tour 10 and Tiger Woods PGA Tour 11 and in a comedic turn in Aqua Teen Hunger Force Zombie Ninja Pro-Am.

In 2012, Van Pelt made the decision to stay with ESPN. In May 2015, the network announced Van Pelt would leave the radio show SVP & Russillo to become a solo anchor for a midnight edition of SportsCenter, which began in late summer 2015. The midnight show covers sports events from the day, but includes additional commentary from Van Pelt and some popular elements from the radio show.

Personal life
Van Pelt's grandfather, Lorenzo, immigrated to the U.S. from Italy and lived in Brooklyn.

References

External links
ESPN bio

American television sports announcers
American sports radio personalities
ESPN people
Golf writers and broadcasters
College football announcers
University of Maryland, College Park alumni
Sportspeople from Montgomery County, Maryland
Living people
Year of birth missing (living people)